Farmanieh (also spelled Farmaniyeh) is a wealthy district located in northern Greater Tehran in the area named Shemiran. It lies within Shemiranat County and also district one of Tehran Municipality. Farmanieh has one of, if not the highest household income rates in Tehran, being home to many embassies, nobles and notables of Iran.

The name of Farmanieh is based on Farmanfarmaian house, one of the noble houses in Qajar dynasty era who used to own much of the land in the area. 

Farmanieh is bordered by Niavaran on the north, Dezashib on the west, Pasdaran Avenue on the east, and Sadr Expressway and Chizar on the south.
The main street of the neighborhood is called Farmanieh Avenue. West end of the street leads to Dezashib area, while the east end leads to Farmanieh roundabout at the intersection with northern Pasdaran Avenue. The official post-revolutionary name for Farmanieh Street is Dr. Lavasani Avenue; however, this name is rarely used colloquially. The street extends for about 7-8 kilometers.

History

Farmanieh used to belong to the house of Qajar dynasty royal prince Abdol Hossein Mirza Farmanfarma (after whom Farmanieh is named). Over years, the original estate was divided between family members and parts of it were sold off to the larger public.

The last few decades have seen an almost feverish rate of development in the area, spurred by the construction of the Sadr Expressway along the district's southern edge. Today, Farmanieh's skyline is dominated by residential towers and commercial skyscrapers, including the Kuh-e Noor banking plaza and shopping center. However, the area's suburban origins are reflected in a small neighborhood park that graces a central square at the intersection of Farmanieh Street and Dibaji Street.

Notable Sights 
 Garden of Italian Embassy
 Embassy of the Netherlands in Iran
 Embassy of Norway in Iran
 Embassy of Sweden in Iran
 Gardeh of Southern Korea Embassy
 Pietro Della Valle Italian School
 Farmanieh Club
 Farmanieh Hospital
 IRISL Group
 Ports and Maritime Organization Of Iran

Education 
Pietro Della Valle Italian School, an Italian international school affiliated to the Italian Embassy in Tehran, is on Farmanieh street just opposite of the garden of Italian embassy.

References

See also

Neighbourhoods in Tehran
Streets in Tehran